Santiago Xanica is a town and municipality in Oaxaca in south-western Mexico.

It is part of the Miahuatlán District in the south of the Sierra Sur Region.

As of 2020, the municipality had a total population of 3,029 inhabitants, with 49.2% woman, and 50.8% men.

References

Municipalities of Oaxaca